Tilden is a village in Randolph County, Illinois, United States. The population was 934 at the 2010 census.

Geography
Tilden is located at  (38.212516, -89.683293).

Demographics

As of the census of 2000, there were 922 people, 362 households, and 263 families residing in the village. The racial makeup of the village was 99.13% White, 0.11% Native American, and 0.76% from two or more races. Hispanic or Latino of any race were 1.52% of the population.

There were 362 households, out of which 34.0% had children under the age of 18 living with them, 53.3% were married couples living together, 12.2% had a female householder with no husband present, and 27.3% were non-families. 23.2% of all households were made up of individuals, and 11.0% had someone living alone who was 65 years of age or older. The average household size was 2.55 and the average family size was 2.96.

In the village, the population was spread out, with 25.4% under the age of 18, 10.8% from 18 to 24, 26.8% from 25 to 44, 22.5% from 45 to 64, and 14.5% who were 65 years of age or older. The median age was 36 years. For every 100 females, there were 100.4 males. For every 100 females age 18 and over, there were 92.7 males.

The median income for a household in the village was $34,115, and the median income for a family was $37,500. Males had a median income of $28,125 versus $19,688 for females. The per capita income for the village was $14,738. About 12.4% of families and 14.7% of the population were below the poverty line, including 16.3% of those under age 18 and 8.7% of those age 65 or over.

References

External links
Randolph County Herald Tribune, local newspaper

Villages in Randolph County, Illinois
Villages in Illinois